Maurice Beyina (born August 8, 1971, in Saint-Denis, France) is a French former basketball player who played seven seasons in the LNB Pro A. He won the French championship in 1992 as a member of EB Pau-Orthez. He played for the Central African Republic national basketball team from 1997 to 2005.

College
Beyina played for the University of Dayton from 1993 to 1997.

References

External links
College statistics at sports-reference.com
LNB Pro A statistics (2002-2004) at basketball-reference.com
Profile at eurobasket.com
Profile at proballers.com
Elan Chalon profile at elanchalon.com

1971 births
Living people
Dayton Flyers men's basketball players
Forwards (basketball)
French expatriate basketball people in the United States
French men's basketball players
French sportspeople of Central African Republic descent
Sportspeople from Saint-Denis, Seine-Saint-Denis